Tribolonotus gracilis, commonly known as the red-eyed crocodile skink, is a species of skink that is sometimes kept as an exotic pet. The species is endemic to New Guinea, where it lives in a tropical rainforest habitat. It was first described by Nelly de Rooij in 1909.

Behavior
Tribolonotus gracilis is one of the few species of skinks that vocalize when in distress. When startled, they tend to freeze and have been known to "play dead" (even when handled).

Reproduction
The red-eyed crocodile skink's sex can be identified by the white pads, or pores, on their hind feet. Only males have these "pores". Females have only a single working ovary (right ovary), laying one egg at a time. The female often curls around the egg and will aggressively defend it when approached by a perceived threat. If the egg gets uncovered, the female will cover it back up. Male crocodile skinks will battle other males.

Captivity
Red-eyed crocodile skinks are available in the pet trade, but most are wild-caught rather than captive-bred. Handling is typically very stressful for this species and therefore discouraged.

References

Further reading
 de Rooij N. 1909. "Reptilien. (Eidechsen, Schildkröten und Krokodile)." Nova Guinea 5 (3): 375-383. ("Tribolonotus gracilis, n. sp.", pp. 381–382).

Tribolonotus
Skinks of New Guinea
Reptiles described in 1909
Endemic fauna of New Guinea
Taxa named by Nelly de Rooij